Faunts is an electronic rock band, formed in 2000 Edmonton, Alberta, Canada, by Paul Arnusch and brothers Steven and Tim Batke.  Faunts creates ambient music by arranging electronic beats with rock music, synthesizers, and drums.  In 2009 the band was described as "slow-motion shoegazers reborn as purveyors of luminous and deeply affecting electronic pop."

History
Faunts was formed in the fall of 2000 by musicians Paul Arnusch, Steven Batke, and Tim Batke.  Their debut album, High Expectations/Low Results, was released in 2003 by Friendly Fire Recordings and was met with a positive reception.

In 2005, the band began writing their first EP, M4.  Faunts desired to have their music crafted to accompany short films for the Film and Video Arts Society.  Keyboardist Joel Hitchcock and mixer Rob Batke joined the band, and Dave Swanson and Nathan Seattler assisted with writing the album's lyrics.  M4 released in 2006 and achieved notoriety when the song "M4, Pt. II" was featured in the final credits of BioWare's 2007 video game Mass Effect.  This raised the band's profile and "a sizeable new audience was exposed to Faunts’ moody, subdued melodies."

On November 18, 2008, Faunts released a remix album titled Faunts Remixed, featuring remixes by acts such as Mark Templeton and DVAS.
  This was followed by their second full studio album, Feel.Love.Thinking.Of,
 which was released on February 17, 2009 and is the result of songwriting over the course of touring across America. The song "Das Malefitz" was featured during the final credits of Mass Effect 3.
On November 17, 2012, the band released "Left Here Alone", described by a press release as "an offering of a handful of unreleased yet essential songs that fill in the empty spaces between High Expectations/Low Results and M4 in Faunts' evolutionary map. Listening to this record is like traveling through the band's back catalogue."

Between Feel.Love.Thinking.Of and Ostalgia, Tim Batke formed the band Duplekita with fourteen friends from other bands, and Rob Batke left Faunts indefinitely to pursue a solo career under the pseudonym Artisan Loyalist.

On February 12, 2016, Faunts announced the upcoming release of Ostalgia, "a five-volume compilation of new music."  Volume 1, released August 12, 2016, is a five-part song titled "Thirty-Three," the sound of which hearkens back to the band's early work while exploring new musical territory. On September 9, 2017, Faunts announced on their Facebook page they were "Busy working on Volume 2 and are planning to release a new single soon."

On August 27, 2019, the band released a new single titled "There Will Be Blood"

Members

Current
Steven Batke - vocals, guitar
Tim Batke - vocals, guitar, keyboard
Paul Arnusch - drums

Former
Joel Hitchcock - keyboard
Rob Batke - keyboard, laptop
Scott Gallant - bass

Discography

Studio albums
High Expectations/Low Results (October 18, 2005) 
Feel.Love.Thinking.Of (February 17, 2009)

EPs
M4 (December 11, 2007) 
Left Here Alone (November 17, 2012) 
Ostalgia, Volume 1 (August 12, 2016)

Remix albums
Remixed (November 18, 2008)

See also

Music of Canada
Canadian rock
List of Canadian musicians
List of bands from Canada

References

External links
Faunts' Bandcamp page
Band bio from Kinsella Recordings
Band bio from Friendly Fire Recordings
There Will Be Blood Song Page

Canadian indie rock groups
Canadian experimental musical groups
Canadian post-rock groups
Dream pop musical groups
Musical groups established in 2000
Musical groups from Edmonton
Post-punk revival music groups
2000 establishments in Alberta